Assevillers is a commune in the Somme department in Hauts-de-France in northern France.

Geography
Assevillers is close to the motorway A1 Lille - Paris, the TGV Haute-Picardie station and the Albert – Picardie Airport. The nearest larger town is Péronne.

History
During World War One, Assevillers had been occupied by German Army. There were many trenches to the west and to the east of Assevillers. During the battle of the Somme in 1916, Assevillers had been destroyed. In 1918, Assevillers was liberated by Australian Army on 28 August 1918.

Assevillers rest area
Assevillers rest area is one of the largest motorway areas in Europe. There are many shops and hotels at this rest area which is situated alongside motorway A1, at 122 km between Paris and Lille. The Assevillers rest area is close to 'Memory Circuit' (the historical sites of the Somme marked by the first world war).

To see
- The polisher "Gres Saint Martin"
- The church and City Hall
- Assevillers New British Cemetery
- Assevillers Rest Area

See also
Communes of the Somme department
Assevillers Website

References

Communes of Somme (department)